Whitaker is an unincorporated community in Sumner Township, Kankakee County, Illinois, United States.

References

Unincorporated communities in Kankakee County, Illinois
Unincorporated communities in Illinois